Cheshmeh Kabud (also Romanized as Cheshmeh Kabūd, Chashma Kabud, and Chashmeh Kabūd) is a village in Itivand-e Shomali Rural District, Kakavand District, Delfan County, Lorestan Province, Iran. At the 2006 census, its population was 251, in 61 families.

References 

Towns and villages in Delfan County